China Resources Gas Group Limited, or China Resources Gas, was incorporated and registered in Hong Kong in 1994, but previous businesses disposed of by 2009 to be developed as a city gas distribution business.

It is a subsidiary of China Resources Holdings, a conglomerate in Mainland China and Hong Kong.

References

External links
China Resources Gas Group Limited

Companies listed on the Hong Kong Stock Exchange
Government-owned companies of China
China Resources